Thoresson is a Swedish surname. Notable people with the surname include:

Torbjörn Thoresson (born 1959), Swedish sprint canoer
William Thoresson (born 1932), Swedish gymnast

See also
Thoreson
Thorsson

Swedish-language surnames